This list of North American deserts identifies areas of the continent that receive less than  annual precipitation. The "North American Desert" is also the term for a large U.S. Level 1 ecoregion (EPA) of the North American Cordillera, in the Deserts and xeric shrublands biome (WWF). The continent's deserts are largely between the Rocky Mountains and Sierra Madre Oriental on the east, and the rain shadow–creating Cascades, Sierra Nevada, Transverse, and Peninsular Ranges on the west. The North American xeric region of over  includes three major deserts, numerous smaller deserts, and large non-desert arid regions  in the Western United States and in northeastern, central, and northwestern Mexico.

Overview
The following are three major hot and dry deserts in North America, all located in the Southwestern United States and Northern Mexico.
The Chihuahuan Desert is the largest hot desert in North America, located in the Southwestern United States and Northern Mexico.
The Sonoran Desert is a desert located in the Southwestern United States and northwest Mexico. It is the second largest hot desert in North America.
The Mojave Desert is the hottest desert in North America, located primarily in southeastern California and Southern Nevada.

The largest cold desert is the Great Basin Desert, which encompasses much of the northern Basin and Range Province, north of the Mojave Desert.

Other cold deserts lie within the Columbia Plateau/Columbia Basin, the Snake River Plain, and the Colorado Plateau regions.

Full listing

(listed from north to south)
Great Kobuk Sand Dunes three small deserts in northwestern Alaska, part of the Kobuk Valley National Park
Yukon - Carcross Desert, smallest desert in the world
Washington – British Columbia – Idaho – Wyoming – Oregon – Nevada
Much of the Columbia Basin is desert, such as the
Channeled Scablands, a desert in the Columbia Basin of eastern Washington
Most of the Snake River Plain (ecoregion) is sagebrush steppe, but barren lava fields form small deserts, such as
Craters of the Moon National Monument in Idaho
The Wyoming Basin (ecoregion) is dominated by arid grasslands and shrub steppe, but also contains the
Red Desert (Wyoming)
Owyhee Desert, in southwestern Idaho, northern Nevada, and southeastern Oregon.
Y P Desert, a portion of the Owyhee Desert in Idaho
Oregon High Desert, aka "Great Sandy Desert", eastern Oregon
Alvord Desert, a dry lake bed.
Northwest Lahontan subregion in Nevada-part of the Northern Basin and Range (ecoregion)
Black Rock Desert, a dry lake bed.
Great Basin Desert
Nevada, dominated by sagebrush steppe
Forty Mile Desert, in northwest Nevada
Smoke Creek Desert, Nevada (980 sq mi)
Carson Desert
Utah
Great Salt Lake Desert, Utah
Sevier Desert surrounds the intermittent, salty Sevier Lake
Black Rock Desert volcanic field
Escalante Desert (3,270 sq mi)
Colorado Plateau
Utah
San Rafael Desert, the drier portions of the San Rafael Swell
Colorado, dominated by pinyon–juniper woodlands, but contains desert areas where unfavorable soil conditions exist:
Bisti Badlands Desert, New Mexico
Painted Desert, Arizona
Mojave Desert
California (the High Desert); and parts of western Arizona, southern Nevada, and a small portion of Utah.
Death Valley, California
Amargosa Desert, Nevada
Sonoran Desert
Colorado Desert, Southern California (the Low Desert)
Yuha Desert, Imperial Valley, California
Yuma Desert, southwest Arizona
Lechuguilla Desert, southwest Arizona
Tule Desert (Arizona) and Sonora, Mexico
Gran Desierto de Altar, Sonora, Mexico
Baja California Desert, State of Baja California, Mexico
Vizcaíno Desert, central State of Baja California, Mexico
Chihuahuan Desert
Trans-Pecos Desert, west Texas
White Sands, unusual gypsum dune field in New Mexico

Western arid regions of North America
The separately defined western arid regions of North America are continental regions of aridity based on available water in addition to rain shadow-diminished rainfall and which have many non-desert shrub-steppe (EPA) and xeric shrublands (WWF) in addition to desert ecosystems and ecoregions. This large arid region of  includes: deserts, such as the Great Basin Desert and Sonoran Desert; and the non-desert arid region areas (with greater than  annual precipitation) in the Great Basin arid region, Colorado Plateau, Mexican Plateau, and others. This arid region extends  from the top of the North American Desert in Washington and Idaho southward into Mexico in the Trans-Mexican Volcanic Belt. The 'western arid region' is east of and (except for Mojave sky islands) discontiguous from the Mojave Desert, unlike the southwestern Great Basin deserts adjacent with ecotones to the northern Mojave Desert.

See also
Desert ecology
Desert of Maine
Deserts and xeric shrublands – biome and ecoregions
Deserts of California
Great American Desert
List of deserts
List of deserts by area
North American Deserts in List of ecoregions in North America (CEC)
North American Deserts in List of ecoregions in the United States (EPA)
Semi-arid climate

References

 
Deserts
Lists of deserts
Deserts
Deserts
+
Deserts and xeric shrublands
Deserts
Deserts
Deserts
Deserts
Deserts
Deserts
Deserts